Leung Sui Wing (born 22 May 1958) is a former Hong Kong professional football player who played as a sweeper.

Club career
He spent his entire career with Happy Valley. He was the Hong Kong Footballer of the Year in 1983 and 1986.

International career
Leung was the captain of Hong Kong when Hong Kong beat China on 19 May 1985 in a FIFA World Cup qualifying match that eliminated China.

References

1958 births
Living people
Hong Kong football managers
Hong Kong First Division League players
Expatriate football managers in Macau
Macau national football team managers
Association football sweepers
Hong Kong footballers
Hong Kong international footballers
Happy Valley AA players